The 1954–55 Iraq FA Baghdad First Division was the seventh season of the Iraq Central FA League (the top division of football in Baghdad and its neighbouring cities from 1948 to 1973). Al-Haras Al-Malaki won their sixth consecutive league title, beating the Civil Cantonment (C.C.) select team from Habbaniya in the final on 24 April 1955 at Al-Kashafa Stadium.

Matches

Final 
The C.C. team walked off the pitch late in the second half in protest at the referee's decision to award Al-Haras Al-Malaki a second penalty kick won by Ammo Baba. Al-Haras Al-Malaki were therefore awarded the trophy.

References

External links
 Iraqi Football Website

Iraq Central FA League seasons
Iraq
1954 in Iraqi sport
1955 in Iraqi sport